The R152 or  Heyanko-Ramgarh-Jaliapara Road is a transportation artery in Bangladesh, which connected Regional Highway R151 (at Ramgarh Municipality) with Regional Highway R160 (at Jaliapara).

Length
36.211 Kilometer.

Markets crossed

See also
N1 (Bangladesh)

References

Regional Highways in Bangladesh